Peter Allan Renshaw Blaker, Baron Blaker,  (4 October 1922 – 5 July 2009) was a British Conservative politician.

Early life
Blaker was born in Hong Kong, son of Cedric Blaker. He was educated at Shrewsbury School before being evacuated to Canada in 1939. There he took a degree in classics, before being commissioned in the Canadian Army. On return to England he went to New College, Oxford. He qualified as a lawyer, and later joined the Foreign Office.

Political career
In 1964 he was elected Member of Parliament for Blackpool South, which he represented until 1992. In Parliament, he served as a Minister for the Army (1972–74), Foreign and Commonwealth Affairs (1974 and 1979–81). He was a Minister of State in the Ministry of Defence from 29 May 1981, until 9 June 1983. He was sworn of the Privy Council in the 1983 Birthday Honours, and was appointed a Knight Commander of the Order of St Michael and St George (KCMG) on 21 July 1983.

House of Lords
On 10 October 1994 he was created a life peer as Baron Blaker, of Blackpool in the County of Lancaster and of Lindfield in the County of West Sussex.

Coat of arms

Personal life 
In 1953, Blaker married Jennifer Dixon, daughter of diplomat Pierson Dixon. They had one son and two daughters.

Footnotes

References
Times Guide to the House of Commons, 1987
The Peerage Website

External links
 

1922 births
2009 deaths
Conservative Party (UK) MPs for English constituencies
Conservative Party (UK) life peers
Knights Commander of the Order of St Michael and St George
Members of the Privy Council of the United Kingdom
UK MPs 1964–1966
UK MPs 1966–1970
UK MPs 1970–1974
UK MPs 1974
UK MPs 1974–1979
UK MPs 1979–1983
UK MPs 1983–1987
UK MPs 1987–1992
People educated at Shrewsbury School
Alumni of New College, Oxford
Presidents of the Oxford Union
Canadian military personnel of World War II
British expatriates in Hong Kong
British expatriates in Canada
Life peers created by Elizabeth II